Berrya is a genus of evergreen trees with fibrous bark from Southeast Asia and the Pacific Region. The plants are valuable for their timber. The flowers are showy, with large tight clusters of green flowers.

Cultivation
Trees from  Berrya are propagated from seed and grown in warm temperate or tropical climates.

Species
Berrya ammonilla
Berrya cordifolia 
Berrya javanica 
Berrya mollis
Berrya pacifica    
Berrya quinquelocularis

References
Ellison, Don (1999) Cultivated Plants of the World. London: New Holland (1st ed.: Brisbane: Flora Publications International, 1995) 
Botanica Sistematica

Brownlowioideae
Malvaceae genera